Marthe Robert (March 25, 1914 – April 12, 1996) was a French essayist and translator.

Robert was born in Paris on March 25, 1914. In 1941, she met psychoanalyst Michel de M'Uzan, whom she later married. In 1995, she received the Grand Prix National des Lettres.

Her work is influenced by Sigmund Freud and psychoanalysis.

Works

Essays 

 Introduction à la lecture de Kafka, [./https://fr.wikipedia.org/wiki/%C3%89ditions_du_Sagittaire Éditions du Sagittaire], coll. L'heure nouvelle, 1946
 Un homme inexprimable. Essai sur l’œuvre de [./https://fr.wikipedia.org/wiki/Heinrich_von_Kleist Heinrich von Kleist], 1955
 Heinrich von Kleist, Paris, L'Arche, Les Grands dramaturges, 1955
 Kafka, 1960
 L’Ancien et le nouveau, 1963
 La Révolution psychanalytique, 1964, 2 vol.
 Sur le papier : essais, éditions Grasset, 1967
 Seul comme Franz Kafka, 1969
 [./https://fr.wikipedia.org/wiki/Roman_des_origines_et_origines_du_roman Roman des origines et origines du roman], 1972
 D'Œdipe à Moïse : Freud et la conscience juive, 1974
 Livre de lectures I, 1977
 Artaud vivant, et al. 1980
 La Vérité littéraire : livre de lectures II, 1981
 En haine du roman : étude sur Flaubert, 1982
 La Tyrannie de l’imprimé : livre de lectures III, 1984
 Le Puits de Babel : livre de lectures IV, 1987
 La Traversée littéraire, 1994

Translations 

 Contes de [./https://fr.wikipedia.org/wiki/Jacob_et_Wilhelm_Grimm Grimm], Gallimard, 1976
 Kafka (textes choisis), Gallimard, coll. Bibliothèque idéale, 1960
 Ainsi parlait Zarathoustra de [./https://fr.wikipedia.org/wiki/Friedrich_Nietzsche Friedrich Nietzsche] coll. Club français du livre, 1958

References 

1914 births
1996 deaths
French literary critics
Women literary critics
French women critics
French women writers
German–French translators
Writers from Paris
Franz Kafka scholars
Translators of Franz Kafka
20th-century French translators
20th-century French essayists
Translators of Friedrich Nietzsche
Signatories of the 1971 Manifesto of the 343